Thanks for Listening is the seventh full-length studio album by American mandolinist Chris Thile.

Reception
At Metacritic, that assigns a normalized rating out of 100 to reviews from mainstream critics, the album received an average score of 72, based on six reviews, which indicates "generally favorable reviews". At AnyDecentMusic?, that collates critical reviews from more than 50 media sources, the album scored 6.7 points out of 10.

Jeff Tamarkin of Relix stated "Thanks for Listening is a compendium of 10 of those newly penned songs, rerecorded in the studio and presented as something of an overview of where he is as a performer and composer these days, and doubling as an invitation to check out how he’s remodeled the place. Thile’s approach ranges from the minimalist, solo “Balboa” to the supersized, urban love-letter “Thank You, New York” to “Feedback Loop,” a commentary on our social media addiction that could pass as a lost Simon & Garfunkel classic. Throughout, of course, Thile's virtuosic mandolin shines, but here, he's got a greater goal than reminding us that he is peerless on the instrument—with Thanks for Listening, Thile is both extending his sincere gratitude to us for coming along on his ride and laying down tracks toward wherever this might take him."

David McGee of The Absolute Sound noted "Very much a meditative, singer-songwriter affair, Thank You for Listening finds Chris Thile offering bromides to a society roiled by political, social media, and cultural upheavals in 2017. Playing almost all the stringed instruments himself—with the mandolin employed in an Impressionistic manner—and joined vocally on occasion by Sarah Jarosz, Aoife O’Donovan, and Gaby Moreno, Thile gracefully, nay ethereally, serves up ten songs he wrote last year for A Prairie Home Companion. So composed is he in his task that listeners may miss the seething undercurrent fueling lyrics inveighing against the alienating dangers of social media in the echo-laced “Feedback Loop” but will have no trouble identifying the object of derisive barbs hurled in the more muscular “Falsetto” (“Froggy thinks his whistle is the Liberty Bell,” for one)."

Track listing

Personnel
Band
Chris Thile – producer, strings, vocals
Ted Poor – drums 
Aoife O'Donovan – vocals
Gaby Moreno – vocals
Sarah Jarosz – vocals
Thomas Bartlett – engineer, keyboards, producer
Alan Hampton – bass (electric), double bass
Nadia Sirota – viola

Production
James Yost – engineer
Oliver Jeffers – back cover, over illustration
Robert Hurwitz – executive producer
Patrick Dillett – engineer, mixing
Greg Calbi – mastering

References

External links

Chris Thile albums
2017 albums